The Abbot of Newbattle (later Commendator of Newbattle) was the head of the Cistercian monastic community of Newbattle Abbey, Midlothian. It was founded by David I of Scotland in 1140.

List of abbots
 Radulf, 1140-1147x1150
 Amfrid, 1159-1179
 Hugh, 1179-1201
 Adam, 1201-1213
 Alan, 1213-1214
 Richard, 1214-1216
 Adam de Harcarres, 1216-1219
 Richard (I), 1219-1220
 Richard (II), 1220-1223
 Constantine, 1236
 Roger, 1236-1256
 William, 1256-1259
 Adam de Maxton, 1260-1261
 Guy, 1261-1269
 Waltheof, 1269 -1272
 Patrick  (?)
 Walter (?)
 John, 1291-1296
 Gervase, 1306-1323
 William, 1328 -1345
 John de Wedel, 1329 x 1342
 Andrew, 1351
 William, 1356-1362
 Hugh de Moffet, 1366-1384 x 1392
 Nicholas, 1390
 John de Halis, 1392-1399
 John Gugy, 1402-1412x1413
 William de Manuel, 1412-1419
 Thomas de Langlandis, 1422
 Thomas Livingston, 1422
 David Croyser, 1422-1432 x 1443
 Thomas de Lundie, 1443-1458
 [William Hyriot listed in Thomas Innes's notes under 1458 (Newb. Reg., xxv.]
 Patrick Mador, 1461-1472See also Deer.
 John de Creton (Crichton), 1474
 John Atkinsoune, 1478-1482 x 1488
 Peter, x 1489
 Andrew Langlands (Longant, Longlad), 1489-1503
 John Turnbull, 1503-1520
 Edward Schewill, 1520-1529
 James Haswell, 1529-1547 [1557]

List of commendators
 Mark Kerr (I), 1547-1584
 Mark Kerr (II), 1567-1587

See also
 Newbattle Abbey

Notes

References
 Cowan, Ian B. & Easson, David E., Medieval Religious Houses: Scotland With an Appendix on the Houses in the Isle of Man, Second Edition, (London, 1976), p. 77
 Watt, D.E.R. & Shead, N.F. (eds.), The Heads of Religious Houses in Scotland from the 12th to the 16th Centuries, The Scottish Records Society, New Series, Volume 24, (Edinburgh, 2001), pp. 159–63

Cistercian abbots by monastery
History of Midlothian
People associated with Midlothian
Scottish abbots
Lists of abbots